FC Luki-Energiya Velikiye Luki is a Russian football team from Velikiye Luki. It played professionally from 1997 to 2001 and again from the 2017–18 season. Their best result was 11th place in the Russian Second Division, Zone West in 1998. The club was reformed in 2014 and played on amateur levels. It received the professional license for the third-tier Russian Professional Football League for the 2017–18 season.

Current squad
As of 21 February 2023, according to the Second League website.

Team name history
 1991: FC Ekspress Velikiye Luki
 1992: FC SKIF-Ekspress Velikiye Luki
 1993: FC SKIF-Yunost Velikiye Luki
 1994–1995: FC Chayka Velikiye Luki
 1996–2000: FC Energiya Velikiye Luki
 2001–2002: FC Krivichi Velikiye Luki
 2003–2005: FC Luki-SKIF Velikiye Luki
 2014–    : FC Luki-Energiya Velikiye Luki

References

External links
  Official site
  Team history at Footballfacts

Association football clubs established in 1991
Football clubs in Russia
Sport in Pskov Oblast
1991 establishments in Russia